Institute of Polish Philology may refer to:

Institute of Polish Philology, Gdańsk University (:pl:Wydział Filologiczny Uniwersytetu Gdańskiego)
Institute of Polish Philology, Jan Kochanowski University in Kielce (:pl:Wydział Humanistyczny Uniwersytetu Jana Kochanowskiego w Kielcach#Instytut Filologii Polskiej)
Institute of Polish Philology,  Opole University (:pl:Instytut Filologii Polskiej Uniwersytetu Opolskiego)
Institute of Polish Philology,  Wroclaw University (:pl:Instytut Filologii Polskiej Uniwersytetu Wrocławskiego)
Institute of Polish Philology, University of Zielona Góra (:pl:Wydział Humanistyczny Uniwersytetu Zielonogórskiego#Instytut Filologii Polskiej)